The year 1931 in tennis was a complex mixture of mainly amateur tournaments composed of international, invitational, national, exhibition, team (city leagues, country leagues, international knock-out tournaments) events and joined by an up-and-coming Pro Tour both on competitive and exhibitional levels.

At the end of the pro season the champion title was awarded. Bill Tilden held the title at the end of the year. He also ran his own pro organization called the Tilden Tennis Tours and toured the world with a series of pro exhibition-like matches. The European professionals of Germany, France, Britain, Austria, the Netherlands and Switzerland founded the International Federation of Professionists and Professionals headed by Roman Najuch to represent their interest against the International Lawn Tennis Federation (ILTF). There were a few occasional professionals against amateur challenges as well held in team competition format. The amateur events were almost all co-educated thus the majority included a mixed title contest. Irishman George Lyttleton-Rogers dominated the European scene winning eight singles titles, all of which were confined to French and Italian championships. Ellsworth Vines was the dominant male player on the North American tour. The women's most successful players were Miss Elizabeth Ryan in North America and Cilly Aussem in Europe and in South America. Australian tennis life was figureheaded by Jack Crawford.

The most prestigious team cups were the Wightman Cup for ladies and the Davis Cup (called the International Lawn Tennis Challenge) for men. The 1931 Wightman Cup was its 9th edition and was organized by the United States Tennis Association between the teams of Great Britain and the United States. The 1931 International Lawn Tennis Challenge was its 26th edition and was organized by the ILTF. The Americas Zone was split into the North/Central American Zone and the South American Zone. The winner of each sub-zone would play to determine who moved to the Inter-Zonal round. 22 teams entered the Europe Zone, while 7 participated in the Americas Zone. The United States defeated Argentina in the American Zone, but would then lose to Great Britain in the Inter-Zonal play-off. France defeated Great Britain in the Challenge Round, giving France their fifth straight title. The final was played at Stade Roland Garros in Paris, France, on 24–26 July.

Legend 

This list includes men and women international tournaments (where at least several different nations were represented), main (annual) national championships, professional tour events and the Davis Cup

Pre-tournament season 
 Italy beat Monaco and the team of São Paulo in international team challenges four to one in both matches.
 In the Paris – Stockholm club competition, the French troupe led by Jacques Brugnon and Christian Boussus beat the Swedish squadron four to one.
 The Czechoslovakian professionals headed by Karel Koželuh and Pavel Macenauer toured South Africa where they scored two draws against the home team twice in Durban and Port Elizabeth.
 Vincent Richards retired and dropped his World Pro title as of the start of the year to handle his business affairs, although he came back to playing during the season.
 Emmett Paré turned professional and later joined the Tilden Tennis Tours.

January 
 Bill Tilden turned professional as of this season after violating the amateur rules by signing a three-picture contract with Metro Goldwyn Mayer and thus was expelled from the ILTF.
 Frank Hunter turned professional in mid-January.
 Harry Hopman wins all three titles at the Sydney Metropolitan Championship.
 The simultaneous use of two racquets by one player was officially banned as of this season.
 Jean Schopfer, the second ever champion of the French Championships, died.
 In the Berlin – Paris city club competition on 10 and 11 January, the French team led by Borotra, Boussous and Brugnon beat the German team led by Von Cramm, Kleinschroth and Prenn by eleven to two.
 A British team led by Bunny Austin and John Olliff toured British India.

February 
 Dutch player Hendrik Timmer was hit by a disease and missed the season. Two Dutch female players announced their engagements and subsequently their retirement from professional sports. Netherlands' number one Kea Bouman married in Almelo and moved to Java while second ranked Margaretha Dros-Canters married and decided to dedicate herself solely to her marriage after the season.
 The strike of the German tennis players continued from last month and caused a major setback on the indoor tournaments. Thus the German International Covered Courts tournament field was dominated by foreign and senior players such as World War I French veteran Eugene Broquedis who reached the semifinal of the singles and the final of the doubles competition despite being 45 years old and having his right shoulder and two fingers paralyzed in the war.
 Newcomer young German tennis player Harry Schwenker shocked the tennis world by defeating Italian champion Umberto De Morpurgo in the semifinals of the Berlin Covered Court Championships. He went on to defeat Austrian champion Hermann Artens in the final of his debut tournament. The match lasted until midnight.
 Jack Crawford won his first Australian Championships singles and mixed doubles title (partnering his wife Marjorie Cox Crawford). He defeated last year's runner-up Harry Hopman for the singles title and teamed up with him for the doubles. He didn't succeed in defending his doubles title losing to Donohoe/Dunlap in the final.
 The team of England played Denmark in Copenhagen as part of their North Europe indoors exhibition tour and drew 4–4.
 Takeichi Harada announced he will skip the Davis Cup due to his business affairs.
 Jacques Brugnon swept all possible titles at the Gallia L. T. C. de Cannes.

March 
 The city of London wins the 16th annual London-Paris tennis club competition (14–7).
 Béla von Kehrling repeated his 1929 feat by winning the triple crown again in the French Riviera Championships.
 George Lott won the Canadian Championships for the fourth time of his career.
 The team of Bremen defeated the players of Amsterdam by 10 to 7.
 The Fédération Française de Tennis issued legal proceedings against Henri Cochet because of a suspected breach of amateur tennis regulations.
 The legal proceedings against German Daniel Prenn ended with the conclusion that the accusations were misled by the confusion of similar family names.
 Nineteen-year-old national junior champion György Drjetomszky won his first Men's trophy at the Hungarian Covered Courts tournament and thus was invited to the Hungary Davis Cup team and to their first round match against Italy.
 Hamburg defeated Rhine Valley 6–5 in Hamburg.
 En route to Europe the Japanese Davis Cup team, headed by Jiro Sato and Hyotaro Sato, played exhibition matches in Singapore.
 The team of England defeated Sweden in their North Europe indoors exhibition tour 5–1, and Norway 9–0 two times in a row.
 René Lacoste and his doubles partner Jacques Brugnon both had appendicitis surgeries and subsequently missed the upcoming tournaments.
 Colin Gregory and Harry Lee announced they will miss the Davis Cup first round rubbers due to their business affairs.
 Iwao Aoki won a triple crown in the Surrey Grass Court Championships.
 Harry Hopman was victorious at the singles, doubles and mixed doubles event at the South Australian Championship.
 On 20 March in the assembly of the International Tennis Federation in Paris the Norges Tennisforbund (Norway Tennis Association) was granted membership into the ITF.
 The team of France defeated the United States team 3–2 in a five–match indoors competition played at the Seventh Regiment Armory in New York from March 23 through March 25.

April 
 A British-only 16–men and 16 women trials was held at the Queen's Club by the Lawn Tennis Association to decide who was about to represent the Great Britain Davis Cup team in the 1931 Davis Cup. The final was played by Bunny Austin and Fred Perry. Bunny Austin won the contest three sets to two (3–6, 4–6, 8–6, 6–1, 7–5). Both went on to be selected in the upcoming Davis Cup rubbers. 
 France won the friendly Davis Cup preparation match against the United States three to two.
 In an internationals tennis club challenge FC Lyon beats Uhlenhorster Klipper (4:3).
 Berlin overcame Prague in the two cities' tennis challenge (8–1).
 Ohye and Spier won the men's and women's singles title at the Java Championships.
 Japan beat Austria in a friendly Davis Cup match.
 Heinz Landmann missed Germany's Davis Cup first round because of his office duties.
 Hyotaro Sato won all three titles in the St. Raphaël T.C. Championships.

May 
 Roderich Menzel moved to Berlin to work at the publisher Ullstem Verlag and pursue tennis at the Rot-Weiss Tennis Club.
 George Lyttleton-Rogers won the 31st edition of the Parthenopean Championship. He was also a runner-up for the doubles, which was won by De Stefani/Del Bono team.
 Mrs. Schréder was granted a double prize at the Balkan Cup. Along with the annual porcelain cup awarded to the winner exceptionally she received the silver traveling trophy as well (awarded permanently only to three times champions).

June 
 Ernest Black, competitor for the first ever Davis Cup representing Great Britain, died.
 The Hungary-Yugoslavia friendly match was suspended due to rules interpretation differences.
 Daniel Prenn was suspended for six months by the German Tennis Union for charges that he demanded payment from racket manufacturer Hammer & Co. for using their equipment.
 The T. C. Barcelona—Rot-Weiss Tennis Club of Berlin interclub match was suspended due to heavy rain.
 Béla von Kehrling gave up the final of the Romanian Championships due to his bruised fingers.
 The United States Davis Cup team beat Austria by 5–0 in a friendly match played at the Vienna Park Club on 5–7 June.
 The United States Davis Cup team beat Germany by 5–0 in a friendly match played at the Blau-Weiss Tennis Club in Berlin on 12–14 June.
 Several US states held its national championships. Among them were:
 The state tennis championships of Maryland was won by Berkeley Bell in three straight sets.
 The state tennis championships of California was held in Berkeley from June 6 though June 14. The men's singles title was won by Ellsworth Vines and the doubles by Vines and Keith Gledhill. The women's singles was won by Alice Marble and the doubles by Marble and Dorothy Weisel.
 The state tennis championships of Delaware was won by Wilmer Allison both in singles and in mixed doubles partnering Florence Lebontillier. Berkeley Bell and Eddie Jacobs were victorious in doubles. Marion Jessup won the ladies title.

July 

 Hungary Davis Cup team permanent member between 1924 and 1931 and five time Hungarian Covered court champion (1924–29), Imre Takáts died.
 Jean Borotra was officially excluded from the doubles competition at Wimbledon.
 The Wimbledon Juniors' Championship was won by Charles Edgar Hare, while the girls' champion was Sheila Hewitt beating Kay Stammers.
 The English women players won all eight matches against the German women.
 Germany beat South Africa in a nine-rubber challenge allowing their opponents to win only one of them.
 Argentine beat Canada in a friendly national team competition.
 Several federal championships were held throughout the Weimar Republic. These include:
 The Württemberg Championships in Stuttgart was won by Philipp Buss (singles, doubles with Oppenheimer) and Frau Hammer (singles, mixed with Lorentz), the Chemnitz's Championships won by Ludwig Haensch (singles, doubles with Bergmann) and Frau Deutsch, the South Germany Championships in Karlsruhe also by Haensch, Buss/Oppenheimer in doubles and Frau Friedleben in singles and paired with Buss in mixed, and in Düsseldorf Fritz Kuhlmann won over Remmert.
 At the Rhine valley Championships in Duisburg Béla von Kehrling won a triple title.
 In Warnemünde Kuhlmann was granted a walkover in the final, Friedrich Frenz won the doubles with Friedrich-Wilhelm Rahe and the mixed doubles with Frau Ewen.
 In the Heringsdorf Championship Men's singles Henner Henkel scored the win when his opponents, Rau retired in the fourth set. They teamed up for the doubles but lost in the final match to Hans-Georg Lindenstaedt and Herr Bräuer. Nelly Neppach earned a clean victory losing one game in the final. The singles champions teamed up and successfully took the prize in the mixed event.
 The Zoppot tournament champions were Heinz Pietzner, Frau Hammer and Friedrich Frenz/Friedrich-Wilhelm Rahe.
 The Sudeten Germans beat the Austrian national team in Marienbad.
 French Davis Cup team beat Belgium in Le Touquet on a preparation match.
 Keith Gledhill defeated Ellsworth Vines in straight sets in the final of the Rhode Island state tennis championships.

August

September 
 Béla von Kehrling won his 27th title of the year at the Oradean Championships.
 The U.S. Junior Championships was won by Jack Lynch against Jay Cohn
 An international team event between France, Great Britain and the United States was held at the Germantown Cricket Club in Philadelphia from 2–4 September. The final score was Great Britain (4 wins), United States (3 wins) and France (2 wins).

October 
 Former US top 10 player Frederic Mercur was reinstated by the USLTA and was allowed to play as of 1 October.
 Bruce Barnes turned professional and signed with the Tilden Tennis Tours.

November 
 Jack Crawford was granted the Queensland Cup after winning the Queensland Championships for the third time.
 Active Mexican Davis Cup member and second ranked national tennis player Manuel Llano died.

December 
 1912 US Open contestant Harold Braley was killed in a car.
 After winning two titles and an exhibition in Buenos Aires Cilly Aussem had to cut off her South American tour and return to Germany because of a liver infection.
 John Lim gave up the S.C.R.C. final because of a blistered finger.
 In December, the professional players living in Germany, France, Britain, Austria, the Netherlands and Switzerland formed the "Fédération internationale des Professeurs et Professionels" to represent their interest against the ITF. Roman Najuch was elected its President.

Tilden Tennis Tours

Unknown date

Rankings 
These are the rankings compiled published in the Swiss newspaper Züricher Sport in October 1931, a second list based upon the ranks of Pierre Gillou, President of the Fédération Française de Tennis, and a third by A Wallis Myers, founder of the International Lawn Tennis Club of Great Britain.

Men's singles

Notes 

 The men, women and mixed contests were held at different locations at different dates. The final was suspended due to Béla von Kehrling's schedule conflict (he travelled to Wimbledon), and was finished later. The same reason forced him to withdraw from the doubles and mixed doubles draws as well.
 Both Roderich Menzel and Gustav Jaenecke reached the main draw from the qualifying rounds.
 The men's, women's and mixed contests were held at different locations at different dates. The West Side Tennis Club of Forest Hill, California organized the men's (September 5–12), women's singles and doubles (17–22 August) while the men's and mixed doubles took place in Chestnut Hill, Massachusetts from 24–29 August.

  The mixed doubles final of the Bad Homburg Championship remained unplayed. The prize money was halved between the finalists.
 The women's championships were played in a round-robin format (meaning players played against all the other players in their group).
 Several matches were suspended and cancelled due to hailstorms and blizzards. Many players travelled home and granted walkovers to their opponents.
 Sources differ regarding the scores of certain finals of this event. Tennisz és Golf of Budapest (g) and The Argus of Melbourne (h) claim the men's singles and doubles scores differently though they both agree on their outcome.
  Frank Shields wasn't able to compete in the final of the Wimbledon Championships because of a twisted knee, which was injured in the ninth game of the fourth set of his semifinal match against Jean Borotra.

See also 
 Grand Slam (tennis)#Three-Quarter Slam

References

External links 
 ITN filmreel of 1931 Wimbledon Championships

 
Tennis by year